The 1974 Camel GT Challenge season was the 4th season of the IMSA GT Championship auto racing series.  The series was for GTO and GTU class Grand tourer racing cars.  It began April 21, 1974, and ended December 1, 1974, after twelve rounds. 1974 would be the first time that the series would leave the United States, with races in Canada and Mexico. It would also be the only time IMSA GT would leave northern North America (i.e. the United States and Canada). The TO and TU classes, which had been composed of former Trans Am Series cars from before the championship's debut, were dropped due to Trans Am having been "absorbed" by IMSA GT and thus becoming nigh indistinguishable from IMSA.

Schedule
Some events were run twice, with each running counting as one round.

Season results

External links
 World Sports Racing Prototypes - 1974 IMSA GT Championship results

IMSA GT Championship seasons
IMSA GT